The Recordings of the Middle East is the first extended play released by Australian folk band The Middle East on Spunk Records. The band released the EP in Australia on October 27, 2009, and in the United States on June 8, 2010. The Middle East made the album available to download from their Myspace page on October 27, 2009. Prior to the release of this EP and the band's first hiatus they released a longer version of this record with three extra tracks: "Pig Food", "The Fall of Man", and "Tsietsi".

Background

Their songs "The Darkest Side" and "Blood" came in at number 87 and 64, respectively, on the Australian Triple J Hottest 100 in 2009. Their song "Blood" is also featured in the films Accidents Happen, It's Kind of a Funny Story, and Crazy, Stupid, Love, as well as an episode of the Australian television comedy-drama series Offspring, a TV commercial for the European bank BNP Paribas, and in the trailer for the film Jeff, Who Lives at Home. It was also covered by British folk rock band Mumford & Sons and their opening act Gang of Youths on their 2019 Delta Tour.

Track listing

Personnel
The Middle East:
 Joseph Ireland - Banjo, Glockenspiel, Mandolin, Vocals
 Timothy Barwise - Bass guitar, Vocals
 Melinda Frewen-Lord - Cello
 Javed Sterritt - Drums, Accordion, Vocals
 Jordan Ireland - Guitar, Vocals
 Rohin Jones - Guitar, Vocals
 Bree Tranter - Piano, Keyboards, Flute, Vocals
 Mitch Knox - Trumpet, Guitar, Vocals
 Katrina Frewen-Lord - Viola
 Steve Frewen-Lord - Violin

Additional personnel:
 Choir – Belinda Sherriff, Gabrielle Craine, Hannah Redshaw, Imogen Guest, Kate McHugh, Katherine D, Rachel Ireland, Sam Rowe, Tiffany Holmes
 L’Orfèvre - Producer

Charts

References

2009 debut EPs
The Middle East (band) EPs